In algebra, a filtered ring A is said to be almost commutative if the associated graded ring  is commutative.

Basic examples of almost commutative rings involve differential operators. For example, the enveloping algebra of a complex Lie algebra is almost commutative by the PBW theorem. Similarly, a Weyl algebra is almost commutative.

See also 
Ore condition
Gelfand–Kirillov dimension

References 
Victor Ginzburg, Lectures on D-modules

Ring theory